Little Hell is the third album by City and Colour, released on June 7, 2011. Besides Dallas Green who recorded the majority of the instrumentals himself, contributing musicians on the record include Daniel Romano of Attack in Black, Dylan Green and Scott Remila of Raising the Fawn, Nick Skalkos of The Miniatures, Misha Bower of Bruce Peninsula and Anna Jarvis and Jordan Mitchell of The Rest. The album art is an illustration of Allard Schager's photograph "Fields of Gold", taken in a tulip field outside Alkmaar in North Holland.

The album received generally positive reviews from music critics. At Metacritic, which assigns a normalized rating out of 100 to reviews from mainstream critics, the album received an average score of 78, based on 11 reviews, which indicates "generally favorable reviews". The track "Sorrowing Man" was used as the opening theme song of the Thandiwe Newton series Rogue during its second season, and was also used in the One Tree Hill ninth season episode, "A Rush of Blood to the Head".
Album cover art work inspired by the 1976 film Futureworld. In the film once the cast enters the simulation the art work hanging on the wall at the 27:53 time stamp can be seen however not identical to the album cover the inspiration is revealed.

Promotion and release
Green began performing the songs "O' Sister" and "Silver and Gold" live on his Canadian tour in September 2009, while most of the album was already written, although it was not recorded until January 2011. Although "O' Sister" had been confirmed by Green to be the first single, "Fragile Bird" was released instead, on April 5, 2011. The music video of "Fragile Bird" was premiered on Dallas' YouTube channel on May 26, 2011. On February 23, 2011, Green revealed the album's name as Little Hell. On March 23, 2011, Green revealed the album's track listing and release date on his MySpace blog. On May 31, 2011, a week before the release, the album was streamed for free through the websites of MTV and MuchMusic for Canadian residents. The album debuted at number 1 on the Canadian Albums Chart, selling over 20,000 copies in its first week, and at number 28 on the US Billboard 200.

Track listing

Personnel

City and Colour
 Dallas Green – vocals, guitar, piano
 Daniel Romano – guitars, bass guitar, harmonies, pedal steel, organ, piano
 Dylan Green – drums, percussion
 Scott Remila – bass guitar, harmonies

Additional musicians
 Nick Skalkos – drums on "Fragile Bird" and "Weightless"
 Misha Bower – harmonies on "Weightless"
 Anna Jarvis – cello on "Northern Wind" and "Silver and Gold"

Charts

Weekly charts

Year-end charts

Certifications

References

External links
 City and Colour official website (Flash site)
 City and Colour MySpace
 [ Dallas Green] at Allmusic

2011 albums
City and Colour albums
Dine Alone Records albums
Vagrant Records albums
Albums produced by Alex Newport